West and soda (also known as The West Way Out) is a 1965 traditionally animated Italian feature film directed by Bruno Bozzetto. It is a parody of the traditional American Western.

In an interview, Bozzetto claimed to have invented the Spaghetti Western genre with this film, an achievement usually attributed to Sergio Leone with his A Fistful of Dollars which was released the year before, but whose development started later and was faster than the traditionally animated West and Soda.

Plot
The plot of the film follows the traditional stranger arriving in a small western town. The stranger finds a pretty woman holding out from selling her uniquely green land to the local big shot, who is harassing her in hope of seducing her/buying her land. There is an ongoing mystery about how the stranger got a hold of the gold nugget he possesses, though at the end of the film it is revealed that he found it in a soap box (it is fake).

Cast

DVD
A PAL R2 DVD of the film has been released in Italy.  It contains 40 minutes of extra material, including interviews, a completely restored version of the film as well as English subtitles.

See also
List of animated feature-length films

References

External links
 Official website
 

1965 films
1965 animated films
1965 comedy films
1960s Western (genre) comedy films
1960s parody films
Films directed by Bruno Bozzetto
Italian Western (genre) comedy films
Italian animated films
1960s Italian-language films
Spaghetti Western films
Western (genre) animated films
1960s Italian films